McKinley is the name of more than one place in Minnesota:
McKinley, St. Louis County, Minnesota
McKinley, Kittson County, Minnesota
McKinley, Minneapolis, Minnesota